Fotbal Club CFR 1907 Cluj, commonly known as CFR Cluj ( or ), is a Romanian professional football club based in the city of Cluj-Napoca, Cluj County, which competes in the Liga I. It was founded in 1907 as Kolozsvári Vasutas Sport Club, when Transylvania was part of Austria-Hungary, and the current name CFR is the acronym for Căile Ferate Române (i.e. "Romanian Railways").

Before its latest promotion to the Liga I in 2004, the club had spent most of its existence in the lower divisions. CFR Cluj has since relied increasingly on foreign players for its success, and in the 2005–06 season participated in its first European competition, the Intertoto Cup, where it finished as runner-up. With significant financial support from previous owner Árpád Pászkány, CFR took the national title away from capital-based teams after seventeen years and became national champion for the first time in the 2007–08 campaign.

Between 2017 and 2022, "the White and Burgundies" won five successive championships. In total, CFR has amassed sixteen domestic trophies, all of them in the 21st century—eight Liga I, four Cupa României and four Supercupa României. As well as becoming a highly esteemed figure in Romanian football, the team has secured three qualifications each to the UEFA Champions League and Europa League group stages and two qualifications to the Europa Conference League group stages.

Additionally, CFR has a fierce rivalry with neighbouring Universitatea Cluj, with matches between the two being known as Derbiul Clujului. Several, but minor rivalries also developed in the recent period against teams with which CFR has contended for the league title.

History

Establishment and early years (1907–1969) 

CFR was founded in 1907, when the city of Cluj-Napoca (then Kolozsvár) was part of Austria-Hungary, under the name Kolozsvári Vasutas Sport Club ("Kolozsvár Railway Sports Club"). From 1907 to 1910, the team played in the municipal championship. However, the club did not have any notable achievements during this time. In 1911, the team won the newly organized Championship of Transylvania. The club consistently finished in second place in that competition between 1911 and 1914, a competition that was interrupted because of World War I. After the war, Transylvania joined Romania and the club accordingly changed its name to CFR Cluj, maintaining its links with the national rail organisation, this time the Romanian state railway carrier, Căile Ferate Române, hence the acronym. They went on to win two regional titles, in 1918–19 and 1919–20.

Between 1920 and 1934 the club did not have any notable achievements. Between 1934 and 1936, CFR played for two seasons in the Divizia B, ranking sixth in the 1934–35 season and eighth in the 1935–36 season. In 1936, CFR was relegated to the Divizia C, where the team played for two seasons, finishing second and 4th, respectively. After World War II, CFR played for one season in the Divizia C, earning the promotion to the Divizia B. Before the start of the 1947–48 season, the team merged with another local club, Ferar Cluj, and played in the Divizia A for the very first time in history. Unfortunately, the team lasted only two years in the first league and would not play there again for another 20 years. In 1960, another merger, this time with Rapid Cluj resulted in CSM Cluj. In 1964, the team's name was changed to Clujeana. In that same year, the club's junior team won the national championship. Three years later, the team's name was reversed yet again to CFR Cluj.

Return to the top flight (1969–1976) 

In 1969, CFR finished first in Divizia B with 40 points, five more than their rival, Politehnica Timișoara. The conclusive game of that season was a 1–1 draw with Politehnica. Politehnica had a 1–0 lead at half-time, but CFR came back with a fine header.

During the summer of 1969, CFR Cluj advanced to Divizia A under the leadership of coach Constantin Rădulescu. Rădulescu was originally from southern Romania, but he grew to manhood in the atmosphere of Transylvania. Before coaching, he had played for CFR and another well-known local team, Universitatea Cluj (or U Cluj), during the 1940s. In the 1969–70 first league championship, CFR made its debut with a 2–0 victory over ASA Târgu Mureș. The next few games did not go as well; although there was a 1–0 win to Politehnica Iași, there were 2 losses to Steaua București (1–3) and Dinamo București (0–2). These and other defeats were a factor in the team's supposed downhill slide. However, the following spring CFR bounced back with a win over ASA Târgu Mureș (1–0), after a goal from Octavian Ionescu, and averted relegation.

At the beginning of CFR's second season in Divizia A, Rădulescu was replaced by Eugen Iordache as head coach. During his tenure, CFR did not do well, and Rădulescu was swiftly brought back. Even so, CFR Cluj found itself again at the bottom of the table before the winter break. The spring of 1971 was somewhat better, although CFR struggled again to avoid relegation. CFR's last game of that season, against UTA Arad, was a memorable one. CFR led 1–0 at half-time. UTA Arad, however, overturned the match after scoring twice. Nonetheless, the persistence of the players from Cluj was rewarded with a late goal, tying the game at 2–2. UTA went on to play in the European Cups, but, most importantly, CFR avoided relegation.

The 1971–72 season started off badly for CFR. Losses to Dinamo București (1–3); Crișul Oradea (0–1, after a last-minute penalty kick), and Jiul Petroșani (1–2 after two regrettable own-goals) meant CFR's demise after the first round of the championship – the team finished at the bottom, with only seven points. CFR's return was dramatic, although inconsistent at times. The team won some important games, such as a 1–0 with Universitatea Craiova and a 3–0 with Petrolul Ploiești. By the end of the season, however, CFR was again struggling to stay in Divizia A. CFR was tied at half-time after having led with 2–0 in their game against Politehnica Iași. In the second half, two late goals from Ionescu and Petrescu saved the team from relegation. When Rădulescu and his players got back home to Cluj, 3,000 fans turned out to celebrate their performance.

During the summer of 1972, CFR made an important transfer. Mihai Adam, from Universitatea Cluj, was traded for Soos. Adam had been twice Romania's top scorer, and was considered one of the best Romanian players of his generation. He and the rest of the team would make the 1972–73 season the most successful in CFR's history. The team achieved its highest ranking ever in Romanian football, fifth in Divizia A. Several important results concluded a great season, including a 2–0 victory against Rapid București, a 2–2 draw against Sportul Studențesc București, and another draw, 1–1, with Steaua București. Additionally, the stadium that CFR continues to use even today was built in 1973. To celebrate the completion of the stadium, CFR Cluj played a friendly game against Cuba. The game ended in a 2–1 victory for CFR.

The 1973–74 season was a rather bad one for CFR, as it barely saved itself from relegation, ranking 14th at the end of the season. The only notable achievement of that season was Mihai Adam's third title as Romania's top goal-scorer who, even though he was 33 years old, scored 23 goals. The 1974–75 season was much like the one before: CFR struggled to avoid relegation, achieving its objectives all the while. The 1975–76 season marked CFR's relegation and its last season in Divizia A during the 20th century. A contributing negative factor was the age of the team, with most of its players in their 30s.

Lower leagues (1976–2002)
During the 1977–78 season, CFR attempted to make a comeback. However, the team finished only second in Divizia B, after Baia Mare. Four years later, CFR slid further down, into the third division, Divizia C. From then on, the team would alternate between the second and third leagues. In 1983, CFR played in Divizia B under its longstanding coach, Dr. Constantin Rădulescu. In the 1990s, CFR struggled financially and found itself more than once on the brink of bankruptcy. Nevertheless, several very talented players were raised, including Cristian Dulca, Attila Piroska, Cristian Coroian, and Alin Minteuan.

Pászkány takeover and first national titles (2002–2012)
In January 2002, a new sponsor, Árpád Pászkány, head of S.C. ECOMAX M.G., founded a new commercial sport society, with ECOMAX M.G. as the primary shareholder. By the end of the 2001–02 season in Divizia C, CFR had been promoted back to Divizia B (later on Liga II).

The summer of 2003 was very important for CFR as many new talented players were transferred including Cătălin Bozdog, Adrian Anca, Cristian Turcu, and Sabin Pîglișan. With these players and others, CFR entered the first league after a successful season in Divizia B. CFR began the season strongly, holding first place for a while. Then the club's main sponsor, Árpád Pászkány, became involved in a public scandal during which Pászkány accused several referees of corruption. The affair plagued the team and resulted in the dismissal of head coach GH. Cioceri.

CFR lost several consecutive games before the scandal subsided. After the winter break, Cioceri was replaced by Aurel Șunda. In the spring of 2004, Sunda's team had a nearly perfect run, winning 14 out of 15 games, with only one draw. One round before the season's end, CFR was in second place, one point behind the Jiul Petroșani in first. But when Jiul was held to a draw by Gaz Metan Mediaș, and CFR won their last match 3–0, CFR advanced to the top of the league for the first time in 28 years. In the summer of 2004, CFR acquired many new valuable Romanian players, including Vasile Jula and Radu Marginean.

CFR Cluj's first year back in Divizia A was strong, yet inconsistent. CFR finished sixth after the first half of the 2004–05 championship. It was during this time that CFR played one of its most popular games ever, defeating Dinamo București at home. The final score was 4–2, after two goals each by Adrian Anca and Sorin Oncică. However, the second half of the championship proved disappointing for CFR, as it gathered only 12 points after 15 games. The team finished 11th, avoiding relegation.

The summer of 2005 brought significant change to CFR Cluj. The club's executives signed the team up for the UEFA Intertoto Cup, being CFR's first European adventure. CFR began well, qualifying for the second round after two victories against FK Vetra (3–2 and 4–1).

Also, the Romanian international Dorinel Munteanu came to CFR from Steaua București. Munteanu would have the dual role of player-coach. His first game produced one of CFR's greatest successes. CFR defeated Athletic Bilbao of Spain 1–0 (although almost all players from Bilbao's side were from the reserve squad) during the second round of the 2005 UEFA Intertoto Cup. The only goal of the match was scored by Cosmin Tilincă with a header. CFR then lost in Bilbao (1–0) but still qualified to the next round after a penalty shootout.

Munteanu's team played the next game at Cluj, against French club Saint-Étienne. Adrian Anca played one of the greatest games in his career, even though the match ended in a 1–1 draw. Anca hit the crossbar with a header early in the game, and Tilincă pushed the ball into the net from the rebound. Anca then went on to earn a penalty, but did not score. He then hit the crossbar a second time in the second half. The away game, in France, was also an eventful game for CFR Cluj. The game began well for CFR, as Cristian Coroian scored from a penalty kick, earned by Adrian Anca. The second half went less smoothly for CFR; Julien Sablé scored for Saint-Étienne, tying the game at 1–1. This was followed by CFR player László Balint's elimination. However, a Cosmin Tilincă goal gave the team the ability to tie with the French at the last minute. The game ended in a 2–2 draw, so CFR went on to the next qualifying stage due to its away goals. In the next round CFR easily disposed of Zalgiris Vilnius, 2–1 in Lithuania and 5–1 at home.

For the final match of the 2005 UEFA Intertoto Cup, CFR Cluj's opponent was another French franchise, RC Lens. The first game, at Cluj, ended in a 1–1 draw with both sides having scored from free kicks. Cristian Turcu scored for CFR. The second game was played at Lens in front of 30,000 French fans. The Romanian players showed signs of exhaustion and conceded three goals. Player-coach Dorinel Munteanu scored a goal from a free kick in the 89th minute. Thus ended CFR Cluj's Intertoto journey. CFR then finished fifth at the end of the 2005–06 domestic season. During the 2006–07 season, major changes at the club started to occur. Dorinel Munteanu resigned as player-coach, and was replaced by Cristiano Bergodi. Foreign players from Western Europe and South America were transferred. A partnership with Portuguese club Benfica was signed. On 22 July 2007, CFR Cluj celebrated its centenary year by playing a friendly game against Benfica and inaugurating the new illumination system at its stadium.

The team's new coach, Romanian Ioan Andone, formerly of Omonia Nicosia and Dinamo București, started the 2007–08 season well, with CFR Cluj leading the league by eight points halfway through the season and remaining undefeated. Their form was not as good in the second half of the season, and they were overtaken by Steaua București with two games remaining. Even though Steaua crushed Gloria Buzau 5–0 in the last matchday, it was not enough to bring the title to Ghencea, since CFR won the derby against Universitatea Cluj and won the title, becoming the first team outside Bucharest to win the title in nearly two decades. Three days later, CFR Cluj completed a league and cup double, beating Unirea Urziceni in the Romanian Cup final.

By winning the league, CFR Cluj qualified for the group stage of the 2008–09 UEFA Champions League season. They were drawn in Group A against Chelsea of England, A.S. Roma of Italy, and Bordeaux of France and given little chance of progressing, with odds of 300–1 being given on them winning the competition. In their opening game, CFR caused a shock by beating Roma in the Italian capital, 2–1, with Argentine Juan Culio scoring the brace. Expectations were further exceeded by holding the previous season's finalists, Chelsea, to a 0–0 draw.

The end of the 2008–09 season saw CFR finish fourth; the team had two coaching staff changes in the second part of the competition and did not manage to secure a second title. The Romanian Cup was kept for a consecutive year at Cluj, and thus they played against Unirea Urziceni (the Liga I champions that season) in the Supercupa României. CFR became the first club not from Bucharest to claim the trophy in 2009.

In the 2009–10 season, the team won the league title for the second time in its history, exhibiting the heavy investments in the club's infrastructure, management, and squad transfers. Managed by coach Andrea Mandorlini, CFR Cluj also kept the Romanian Cup and qualified for the UEFA Champions League group stage. As a premier, the 2009–2010 CFR Fans' Trophy was awarded to Cristian Panin as voted by supporters and football reviewers. The trophy is to be awarded every year by the CFR Cluj fans associations to the player that receives the highest aggregate number of votes online and highest per match rating respectively. The 2010–11 CFR Fans' Trophy was awarded to captain Ricardo Cadú and the 2011–2012 CFR Fans' Trophy was awarded to goalkeeper Beto Pimparel.

The 2011–12 season brought the league title to Cluj for the third time. Starting under Jorge Costa's supervision, the team maintained a spot in the top three. After a few major defeats close to the end of the season, Costa was replaced by Ioan Andone. Under Andone, CFR won all the remaining matches except for one draw, and finished first. Later that year, FC Dinamo București defeated CFR Cluj in the Romanian Supercup with 6–4 after penalties, handing them their first defeat in a final.

Financial difficulties and bounceback (2012–2017)
After 2012, poor management saw the club go through a sharp decline, finishing 9th in the 2012-13 season, though in the Champions League they performed admirably, finishing 3rd on goal difference in a group with Manchester United, Galatasaray and SC Braga with 10 points, a record still standing for a Romanian team. Their Champions League campaign culminated in a 1–0 away win at Old Trafford against Manchester United, with a long shot from Luis Alberto. They were drawn against Inter Milan in Europa League, where they were eliminated 5–0 on aggregate.

CFR had a quiet 2013–14 season, finishing 5th and earning a Europa League berth, mainly due to the fact that 4th placed Dinamo filed for insolvency and thus were ineligible for European competitions. During this time owner Pászkány faced legal charges and neglected the team, which lead to serious financial difficulties that would culminate in the following seasons.

CFR Cluj began the 2014–15 season well, but financial difficulties led to insolvency which subsequently started a period of poor performances. After failing to fully remunerate five former club players, the Romanian Football Federation decided to deduct 24 points from CFR, which placed them in the last position in Liga I. Many players left the club as a result, and Ceferiștii challenged the Federation's decision to the Court of Arbitration for Sport. In May 2015 the Court ruled in their favour, restoring the deducted points, which helped the team secure a third-place finish in the league championship. CFR Cluj won the 2016 Cupa României final played against Dinamo București after penalty shootouts, being their first trophy since 2012.

National dominance and return to European competitions (2017–present) 

During early 2017, it was reported that businessman Marian Băgăcean purchased 62% stake in the club. On 30 May that year, after finishing the 2016–17 Liga I campaign on the 4th place, CFR Cluj finally got out of insolvency and was again able to participate in European competitions starting with the 2018–19 season. In June 2017, Dan Petrescu replaced Vasile Miriuță as the head coach of the team, with the goal of a European cup return and an ambitious transfer campaign to support it.

On 20 May 2018, "the Railwaymen" won 1–0 over defending champions Viitorul Constanța and clinched their fourth Liga I title as they finished one point above FCSB in the table. CFR also came victorious in the subsequent 2018 Supercupa României played against Universitatea Craiova, this time under the management of coach Edward Iordănescu. However, Iordănescu was replaced after just three games and Toni Conceição was brought back for his third term as a manager. The club's European campaign was cut short after Luxembourgish side F91 Dudelange won the UEFA Europa League play-off round 5–2 on aggregate; due to Dudelange's underdog status, daily newspaper Gazeta Sporturilor regarded CFR's elimination as "the biggest shame in the history of Romanian football".

In May 2019, again under the management of Dan Petrescu, "The Railwaymen" earned their fifth Liga I title. Unlike the previous year, the club had a fruitful run in European competitions. After getting past Astana and Maccabi Tel Aviv, CFR Cluj defeated Scottish team Celtic in the Champions League third qualifying round. In the play-off they met Slavia Prague, but lost both matches 0–1 and were sent to the Europa League group stages. There, CFR were drawn against Lazio, Rennes and again Celtic. They finished second behind the latter and earned a total of twelve points in the group, a Romanian record in European competitions. In the round of 32, CFR was eliminated by Sevilla on the away goals rule after two draws—The Spaniards went on to win the final 3–2 against Inter Milan, on 21 August 2020. On 3 August, CFR Cluj won the third consecutive title and sixth overall, after a final fixture win over rivals Universitatea Craiova.

CFR started the 2020–21 UEFA Champions League season by beating Maltese side Floriana. They were then eliminated by Croatian side Dinamo Zagreb at home in a penalty shoot-out. Dropping down to the Europa League, they made it to the group stage after defeating Nordic sides Djurgårdens IF and Kuopion Palloseura. Drawn with AS Roma, BSC Young Boys, and CSKA Sofia in Group A, they eventually finished third and were eliminated from the competition from the group stage. During late 2020, Edward Iordănescu became once again coach of the club after the departure of Dan Petrescu. On 18 May 2021, Iordănescu Jr. managed to win the league title of the 2020–21 Liga I season. This was Iordănescu Jr.'s first national title as head coach. In addition, winning the title with CFR thereby allowed the club to play the final of the 2021 Supercupa României (i.e. the Romanian supercup) against Universitatea Craiova, the winners of the 2020–21 Cupa României (i.e. the Romanian cup), which they eventually lost after 2–4 on penalty shoot-out.

Following the end of the season Iordănescu left the club and was replaced by Marius Șumudică. The latter failed to qualify the club for the group stage of either the UEFA Champions League or UEFA Europa League, being consequently dismissed and replaced by the returning Dan Petrescu. Under Petrescu, CFR qualified for the group stage of the inaugural UEFA Europa Conference League, competing in Group D with Dutch side Alkmaar, Czech side Jablonec, and Danish side Randers. The club debuted with an away 1–0 loss at Jablonec nad Nisou in the Czech Republic against FK Jablonec on 16 September 2021 and consequently on the 4th place in the group after the first fixture. Although Petrescu stated that he wishes to have a longer as possible path with CFR Cluj in UEFA Europa Conference League, it is very unlikely that they will progress from Group D to the Round of 16 or, let alone, other subsequent knockout stages. On the occasion of the second fixture however, the club managed to draw 1–1 over Randers FC and thereby gained its first group point in UEFA Europa Conference League.

After their away match with Randers FC, which they lost 1–2, CFR got mathematically eliminated from advancing to the Round of 16 and finished Group D of the first UEFA Europa Conference League season on the 4th place, regardless of the last home match with FK Jablonec which they eventually won 2–0, thereby gaining their first 3 points in the competition and accumulating a grand total of 4.

While CFR Cluj's 2021–22 European campaign proved to be quite disappointing, the feroviarii had a near perfect domestic season, winning the regular season with 76 out of 90 possible points, 16 points clear of 2nd place. During the playoffs, CFR's worst run of shape during the season, including 2 defeats in a row against Universitatea Craiova and FCSB which shrunk the gap between CFR and the latter to 2 points. Since the final game of the playoff stage would have been a straight game between FCSB and CFR, many pundits emphatically stated that this would be FCSB's season, and declared CFR a "spent team". However, CFR quickly bounced back, and went on a series of 4 consecutive wins, including a 6–0 win over FC Argeș. With FCSB's draw versus Voluntari on 14 May, all CFR needed was to a win to claim the league title, which they would obtain against Craiova, score 2–1. With this, CFR became the team with most leagues won outside the capital (8 titles), as well as the only Romanian team in the 21st century to win 5 titles in a row, thus establishing a true hegemony for half a decade.

Stadium

CFR Cluj plays nearly all of its home games at the Dr. Constantin Rădulescu Stadium, which was expanded in 2008 to seat a maximum capacity of 23,500. It meets all of UEFA's regulations and can also host Champions League matches. In 2006–07, with an investment of €30 million, the club upgraded the field with higher quality turf, built a state of the art lighting system, and updated its infrastructure. All the work was completed for the club's 100th anniversary in 2007, when a friendly game was played against Portuguese side Benfica.

Support

A 2011 survey has shown that CFR Cluj has the fourth-largest number of supporters in Romania. They have many fans in Cluj-Napoca, but also in some other parts of the country. Since the 2014 withdraw of important groups such as "Patriots" and "Commando Gruia", the fans have a single big group called "Peluza Vișinie", which consists of former members of older groups such as "Romaniacs", "Juvenes", "Gruppo Gara", "Valacchi", "Pride 1907", "Nostra Famiglia", and "1907". There is another group of supporters which consists of  ethnic Hungarians who currently sit in the Tribuna 1 sector of the stadium. Their group is named KVSK, which is the Hungarian name of CFR.They had such major conflicts with the Romanians ultras group 'Peluza Vișinie' and decided to go to matches alone. Their support is less vocal and visible, but they are a consistent part of the active fans.

Rivalries
 

CFR Cluj has a fierce rivalry with their local opponents Universitatea Cluj. According to journalist Răzvan Toma, the first match between the two teams was played on 13 October 1920, when CFR thrashed Universitatea 8–0 on a field based in the Central Park. History and statistics website Romanian Soccer regards a 1–3 loss by CFR (which had just merged with Ferar Cluj on 7 December 1947) as the first Liga I meeting between the two teams.

In 2019, Liga Profesionistă de Fotbal's website referred to a match between FCSB—formerly FC Steaua București—and CFR Cluj as "the Romanian Derby", a name generally used for the meetings between the former club and their cross-town rivals Dinamo București. This stems from the fact that after the 2000s CFR and FCSB were often some of the main contenders for the national title, and during the late 2010s the rivalry exacerbated further as Dinamo lost its power status. CFR and FCSB have met each other over 60 times in the first division.

Ceferiștii also hold milder rivalries with Dinamo București, Rapid București, Universitatea Craiova, and Politehnica Timișoara.

Popular culture
CFR Cluj was the subject of a long documentary film directed by Laviniu Lazăr on their 2012–13 UEFA Champions League season and the historical victory over Manchester United at Old Trafford, titled "The Theatre of Dreams" which was presented at the Film Transilvania (TIFF) festival in 2013.

Honours

Domestic

Leagues 

 Liga I
 Winners (8): 2007–08, 2009–10, 2011–12, 2017–18, 2018–19, 2019–20, 2020–21, 2021–22
 Liga II
 Winners (2): 1968–69, 2003–04
 Runners-up (1): 1977–78
 Liga III
 Winners (7): 1946–47, 1982–83, 1985–86, 1988–89, 1990–91, 1995–96, 2001–02 
 Runners-up (1): 1987–88

Cups 

 Cupa României
 Winners (4): 2007–08, 2008–09, 2009–10, 2015–16
 Runners-up (1): 2012–13
 Supercupa României
 Winners (4): 2009, 2010, 2018, 2020
 Runners-up (5): 2012, 2016, 2019, 2021, 2022

European 

 UEFA Intertoto Cup
 Runners-up (1): 2005 (joint runners-up)

Players

First team squad

CFR II Cluj and Youth Academy

Out on loan

Club officials

Board of directors

 Last updated: 6 September 2022
 Source:

Current technical staff

 Last updated: 6 September 2022
 Source:

Records and statistics

European cups all-time statistics

Total UEFA statistics 

.

UEFA club ranking 

In the table below, the current UEFA club ranking position for CFR Cluj is shown based on its current UEFA coefficient for the ongoing 2022–2023 season.

All time records 

 Biggest victory: CFR Cluj – Minaur Zlatna 10–0 (4 October 2003)
 Biggest defeat: CFR București – CFR Cluj 12–2 (20 April 1949)
 Player with most caps in Liga I:   Camora (358)
 Player with most goals in Liga I:  Ciprian Deac (72)
 Biggest European home win: CFR Cluj 5–0  Alashkert (16 August 2018, UEFA Europa League Third qualifying round second leg)
 Biggest European away win:  Vėtra 1–4 CFR Cluj (26 June 2005, UEFA Intertoto Cup First round second leg)
 Biggest European home defeat: CFR Cluj 0–4  Bayern Munich (19 October 2010, UEFA Champions League group stage)
 Biggest European away defeat:  A.S. Roma 5–0 CFR Cluj (5 November 2020, UEFA Europa League group stage)

Other records 

 Since the 2012–13 season, CFR Cluj holds the record for the most points obtained by any Romanian club in the UEFA Champions League group stages, with 10 points, having recorded 3 wins, 1 draw, and 2 losses.
 CFR Cluj also holds the record for most points scored by any Romanian club in the UEFA Europa League group stages, with 12 points, having recorded 4 wins and 2 losses in the 2019–20 season

Domestic history by season 

The players in bold were the top goalscorers in the division.

Notable former players 

The footballers enlisted below have had international cap(s) for their respective countries at junior and/or senior level. Players whose name is listed in bold represented their countries at junior and/or senior level while they played for the club or had a significant number of caps and goals accumulated throughout a certain number of seasons for the club itself as well.

Romania
  Mihai Adam
  Vasile Alexandru
  Adrian Anca 
  Ștefan Balint
  Cristian Bud
  Sergiu Buș
  Sever Coracu
  Cristian Coroian
  Florin Costea
  Florin Dan
  Nicolae Dică
  Cristian Dulca
  Cristian Fedor
  Anton Fernbach-Ferenczi
  Ioan Hora
  Octavian Ionescu
  Vasile Jula
  Ștefan Kovács
  Ionuț Larie
  Bogdan Mara 
  Alin Minteuan
  Dorinel Munteanu 
  Gabriel Mureșan
  Viorel Nicoară
  Sorin Oncică
  Cristian Panin 
  Emil Petru
  Andrei Mureșan 
  Alexandru Chipciu 
  Vasile Maftei 
  Ionuț Rada
  Gheorghe Rășinaru
  László Sepsi
  Eduard Stăncioiu
  Romeo Surdu
  Ion Suru
  Alexandru Marc
  Lucian Goian
  Petru Țurcaș
  Cosmin Tilincă
  Mihai Mincă
  Dorin Toma
  Sergiu Negruț
  Eugen Trică
  Cosmin Văsîie 
  Viorel Vișan
  George Țucudean
  Valentin Costache 
Algeria
  Billel Omrani   
Angola
  Dominique Kivuvu 
Argentina
  Emmanuel Culio 
  Sixto Peralta
  Sebastián Dubarbier
  Diego Ruiz 
  Cristian Fabbiani 
Bolivia
  Gualberto Mojica 
Bosnia and Herzegovina
  Mateo Sušić
  Daniel Graovac
  Stojan Vranješ 

Brazil
  Paulo Vinícius
  Rafael Bastos
  André Galiassi
  Hugo Alcântara
  Didi
  Edimar
  Ronny 
  Weldon
  Renan Garcia
  Júlio Baptista
Burkina Faso
  Yssouf Koné
  Bakary Saré
Cameroon
  Steve Leo Beleck
Canada
  Lars Hirschfeld
Congo
  Férébory Doré
Croatia
  Damjan Đoković
  Antonio Jakoliš
     Tomislav Gomelt
  Saša Bjelanović
Côte d'Ivoire
  Lacina Traoré
  Kevin Boli
  Emmanuel Koné 
  Ousmane Viera
France
  Bryan Nouvier
  Grégory Tadé
  Michaël Pereira
  Robert Maah
Georgia
  Giorgi Chanturia
Ghana
  Sulley Muniru 
Greece
  Pantelis Kapetanos
  Ioannis Matzourakis 
Hungary
  Ádám Lang
Iceland
  Rúnar Már Sigurjónsson
Italy
  Felice Piccolo
  Davide Petrucci
  Roberto De Zerbi
  Ferdinando Sforzini
Lithuania
  Giedrius Arlauskis 
Moldova
  Cătălin Carp
Nigeria
  Nwankwo Obiora
Portugal
  Cadú
  Tony
  Dani
  Tiago Lopes

  Mário Felgueiras 
  Nuno Claro
  Rui Pedro
  António Semedo
  Manuel José
  Filipe Nascimento
  Ivo Pinto
  Nuno Diogo
  André Leão
  Luís Aurélio
  Thierry Moutinho
  Diogo Valente
  Beto
Serbia
  Zoran Milošević
  Svetozar Mijin 
  Sead Brunčević 
Senegal
  Modou Sougou
  Ibrahima Baldé 
Spain 
  Cristian López
  Juan Carlos  
Sweden
  Mikael Dorsin
Tunisia
  Syam Ben Youssef 
Uruguay
  Álvaro Pereira 
  Matías Aguirregaray
  Jorge Martínez
Venezuela
  Mario Rondón

Notable former managers

  Ioan Andone
  Sorin Cârțu 
  Petre Grigoraș
  Ștefan Kovács
  Dorinel Munteanu
  Constantin Rădulescu 
  Toni Conceição 
  Paulo Sérgio
  Jorge Costa
  Cristiano Bergodi
  Andrea Mandorlini 
  Dušan Uhrin Jr. 
  Edward Iordănescu

References

External links

Official website 

Club profile on UEFA's official website
Club profile on LPF's official website 

 
Sport in Cluj-Napoca
Football clubs in Cluj County
Association football clubs established in 1907
Liga I clubs
Liga II clubs
Liga III clubs
1907 establishments in Austria-Hungary
Railway association football clubs in Romania